Parsi theatre is a generic term for an influential theatre tradition, staged by Parsis, and theatre companies largely-owned by the Parsi business community, which flourished between 1850 and 1930s. Plays were primarily in the Hindustani language (especially the Urdu dialect), as well as Gujarati to an extent. After its beginning in Bombay, it soon developed into various travelling theatre companies, which toured across India, especially north and western India (now Gujarat and Maharashtra), popularizing proscenium-style theatre in regional languages.

Entertainment-driven and incorporating musical theatre and folk theatre, in early 1900s, some Parsi theatre producers switched to new media like bioscope and subsequently many became film producers. The theatre diminished in popularity, with arrival of talkies era in Hindi cinema in 1930s. Post-independence, it experienced a revival in the 1950s, much like theatre in the rest of the India.

History
The British community in Bombay had been staging theatre in English language for sometime by the mid-19th century. Parsis were a prominent business community in the city. In early 1850s, the students of Elphinstone College in Mumbai had formed a dramatic society and started performing Shakespeare. The first Parsi Theatre company called "Pārsī Nāṭak Maṇḍali" performed their first play Roostum Zabooli and Sohrab in 1853, followed by King Afrasiab and Rustom Pehlvan and Pādśāh Faredun. By 1860 over 20 Parsi theatre groups were formed in Mumbai.

Sharmistha Gooptu and Bhaumik identify Indo-Persian/Islamicate culture as a major influence on Parsi theatre. Up until the early 20th century, Urdu was the most widely used language in Parsi theater, due to the influence of Urdu poetry. The One Thousand and One Nights (Arabian Nights) also had a strong influence on Parsi theater, which performed "Persianate adventure-romances", which in turn were later adapted into early Bollywood films.

The early plays in Parsi theatre presented Indianized versions of Shakespeare’s plays, by turning them into folk performances, with dozens of songs added in. Soon Indian legends, epic and mythological tales made an appearance as source material. As Parsi theatre companies started travelling across North India, they employed native writers to churn out scripts in Hindustani language, mix of Hindi and Urdu.

Later Parsi plays "blended realism and fantasy, music and dance, narrative and spectacle, earthy dialogue and ingenuity of stage presentation, integrating them into a dramatic discourse of melodrama". For mass appeal the plays incorporated humour, melodious songs and music, sensationalism and stagecraft. The success of Parsi theatre lead to the development of theatre in regional languages notably modern Gujarati theatre, Marathi theatre and Hindi theatre. Later it led  to the development of Hindi cinema (Bollywood), the effect of Parsi theatre is still evident in the Masala film genre of Indian cinema,  and especially in Bollywood film songs. According to screenwriter and lyricist Javed Akhtar, Urdu Parsi theatre's ghazal, thumri and kajri traditions were the basis for Bollywood's filmi-ghazal, thumri and kajri styles of music.

Parsi theatre was also popular in South-East Asia, where it was known as Wyang Parsi and often imitated.

In 1981, Mumbai-based theatre director Nadira Babbar, started her theatre group Ekjute (Together), with the production of Yahudi Ki Ladki, which revived the Parsi theatre style, and is considered one of its finest.

References

Bibliography
 
 
 
 
 
 
 
 

 
 

Culture of Mumbai
Hindi theatre
History of Mumbai
Theatre
Theatre in India